Ozarba acclivis is a moth of the family Noctuidae first described by Rudolf Felder and Alois Friedrich Rogenhofer in 1874. It is found Namibia and South Africa.

References
Felder, C.; Felder, R. & Rogenhofer, A. F. (1864–1875). Reise der österreichischen Fregatte Novara um die Erde in den Jahren 1857, 1858, 1859 unter den Befehlen des Commodore B. von Wüllerstorf-Urbair. Zoologischer Theil. Zweiter Band. Abtheilung 2, Heft 4, Lepidoptera. Atlas der Heterocera. 2:1–20, pls. 1–140.

External links

Acontiinae
Insects of Namibia
Moths of Africa